Life in London may refer to:

Bell's Life in London, an English weekly sporting paper
Life in London (novel), an 1821 book by Pierce Egan which originating the "Tom and Jerry" phrase
Tom and Jerry, or Life in London, an 1821 play adapted from Egan's book

See also
Culture of London
Omnibus Life in London, an 1859 oil painting